Frank Garnier Jaquet (March 16, 1885 – May 11, 1958) was an American actor known for playing supporting roles with his career extended from 1934 to the mid-1950s.

Biography
In 1925, Jaquet was part of the Summer stock cast at the Elitch Theatre.

In 1934, at age forty-nine, Jaquet made his film debut in the short War Is a Racket. Over the next twenty years, he appeared in over one hundred and forty films and TV episodes.

Jaquet died on May 11, 1958 in Los Angeles of a heart attack at the age of 73. He is interred in Hollywood Forever Cemetery.

Selected filmography

 Strange Faces (1938)
 Next Time I Marry (1938)
 The Story of Alexander Graham Bell (1939)
 They Shall Have Music (1939)
 Dust Be My Destiny (1939)
 Mr. Smith Goes to Washington (1939)
 A Dispatch from Reuters (1940)
 Misbehaving Husbands (1940)
 Back Street (1941)
 Federal Fugitives (1941)
 Double Trouble (1941)
 In Old California (1942)
 Call of the Canyon (1942)
 Two Weeks to Live (1943)
 None Shall Escape (1944)
 Beneath Western Skies (1944)
 Call of the South Seas (1944)
 Call of the Rockies (1944)
 Silver City Kid, The Seventh Cross (1944)
 Black Magic (1944)
 Bowery Champs (1944)
 Grissly's Millions (1945)
 The Topeka Terror (1945)
 Beyond the Pecos (1945)
 Santa Fe Saddlemates (1945)
 A Bell for Adano (1945)
 Federal Operator 99 (1945)
 Oregon Trail (1945)
 Mr. Muggs Rides Again (1945)
 Colorado Pioneers (1945)
 The Cherokee Flash (1945)
 Prince of the Plains (1949)
 The Mutineers (1949)
 The Daring Caballero (1949)
 Barbary Pirate (1949)
 Mule Train (1950)
 Rock Island Trail (1950)
 Motor Patrol (1950)
 No Way Out (1950)
 Lonely Heart Bandits (1950)
 King of the Bullwhip (1950)
 Ace in the Hole (1951)
 Jungle Jim in the Forbidden Land (1952)
 Houdini (1953)
 Timberjack (1955)

References

External links

 

1885 births
1958 deaths
20th-century American male actors
American male film actors